Bembe may refer to:

Music
 Bembé (rhythm), in African and Cuban music
 Bembe (West African drumming), in Yoruba music
 Bembe (membranophone), a Trinidadian drum more commonly known as "bemba"
 Bembé (album), by Milton Cardona

People
 Bembe people, people of central Africa
 António Bento Bembe, Angolan general and politician

Other
 Bembe language (Ibembe), spoken by the Bembe people of the Democratic Republic of the Congo and western Tanzania
 Bembe language (Kibembe), spoken in the Republic of the Congo
 Bembe, Angola, a town and municipality in Uíge Province in Angola

See also
 Beembe tribe (Kongo), of the Republic of the Congo